The 1946–47 Chicago Black Hawks season was the team's 21st season in the National Hockey League, and they were coming off a 3rd place regular season finish in 1945–46, followed by being swept by the Montreal Canadiens in the first round of the playoffs.

The Black Hawks would struggle all season long in 1946–47, allowing a league high 274 goals, which was 81 goals higher than the next closest team.  The team had the 2nd highest offense in the league though, scoring 193 goals.  Despite the NHL raising its schedule length to 60 games, the Hawks would not even be close to reaching its point total from the previous season, earning a league low 42 points, and finishing 13 points out of a playoff spot.

Offensively, the Hawks were led by Max Bentley, who led the NHL in points with 72, and he led the Black Hawks with 29 goals and 43 assists.  Doug Bentley would earn 55 points, while Bill Mosienko would score 25 goals and 52 points.  Alex Kaleta (24), team captain Red Hamill (21), and Hully Gee (20) would all reach the 20 goal plateau.  On defense, teenager Bill Gadsby would lead the team with 18 points, while John Mariucci would set a team record for penalty minutes in a season, with 110.

In goal, the Hawks acquired Paul Bibeault from the Montreal Canadiens, and he would lead the team with 13 wins, and had a 4.15 GAA, along with a shutout.  Emile Francis would also get some playing time, earning 6 wins, while posting a 5.47 GAA.

Season standings

Record vs. opponents

Game log

Regular season

Player stats

Scoring leaders

Goaltending

See also
 1946–47 NHL season

References
SHRP Sports
The Internet Hockey Database
National Hockey League Guide & Record Book 2007

Notes

Chicago Blackhawks seasons
Chicago
Chicago